Erling Sandene (7 April 1921 – 5 March 2015) was a Norwegian judge and civil servant.

Early and family life
He was born in Bærum, a son of Jensine Sæther (1887–1981) and her schoolteacher husband Johan Sandene (1885–1945). Sandene married Erna Harbitz Torstenson in 1949 and they remained married until her death in 1986.

He enrolled as a student in 1940, and graduated as cand.jur. in 1943 after only three years. He was also involved in the Norwegian resistance movement.

Career
In 1945 Sandene began his legal career as a deputy judge in Eidsvoll, where he helped handle the postwar legal purge. In 1946 Sandene began working in the Ministry of Justice and the Police. He was promoted to deputy under-secretary of state in 1962.

Sandene became County Governor of Møre og Romsdal from 1966 to 1972. He then served as Supreme Court Justice beginning in 1972 as well as Norwegian Parliamentary Ombudsman from 1974 to 1982. From 1984 to 1991, Sandene was the 17th Chief Justice of the Supreme Court.

Death and honors
Sandene died on March 5, 2015. During his lifetime (1982), Sandene was appointed a Commander with Star of the Order of St. Olav in 1982, and was also a freemason.

References

1921 births
2015 deaths
People from Bærum
Parliamentary ombudspersons in Norway
County governors of Norway
Directors of government agencies of Norway
Chief justices of Norway
Norwegian resistance members
Personnel of the legal purge in Norway
Norwegian Freemasons